The Ambilobe dwarf gecko (Lygodactylus expectatus) is a species of gecko endemic to Madagascar.

References

Lygodactylus
Reptiles described in 1967
Reptiles of Madagascar
Endemic fauna of Madagascar
Taxa named by Charles Pierre Blanc